William "Dolly" King (November 15, 1916 – January 29, 1969) was an American professional basketball and baseball player. He was one of a handful of African Americans to play in the National Basketball League (NBL), the predecessor of the NBA.

King was a multi-sport star at Long Island University during the late 1930s, playing basketball, baseball, and football. According to Clair Bee, King's coach in football and basketball, King once played an entire college football game and an entire college basketball game on the same day. After college, King played several seasons of professional basketball with the all-black New York Renaissance before Lester Harrison signed him to the NBL's Rochester Royals in 1946. King averaged 4.0 points per game in 41 games with Rochester and participated in the league playoffs.

He played in Negro league baseball from 1944 to 1948, spending time with the Homestead Grays, New York Black Yankees, and New York Cubans.

King died of a heart attack in 1969. aged 52.

References

External links
 and Seamheads

1916 births
1969 deaths
African-American basketball players
American men's basketball players
Basketball players from New York (state)
Chicago American Giants players
Cleveland Buckeyes players
Dayton Rens players
Forwards (basketball)
Homestead Grays players
Junior college men's basketball coaches in the United States
LIU Brooklyn Blackbirds baseball players
LIU Brooklyn Blackbirds men's basketball players
Long Island Blackbirds football players
New York Black Yankees players
New York Cubans players
New York Renaissance players
Players of American football from New York (state)
Rochester Royals players
Scranton Miners (basketball) players
Sportspeople from Brooklyn
20th-century African-American sportspeople
Sportspeople from Binghamton, New York
Baseball players from New York (state)